Full Name: Daniel Edgardo Ramada Piendibene (born September 16, 1950) is a Uruguayan theologian and diplomat. He has three children and is married to Marta Sarasola. He is also the grand-nephew of the legendary Jose Piendibene. 
From 2011 to 2015 he was a Uruguayan ambassador to the Holy See and since 2011 he has also been an ambassador to the Sovereign Military Order of Malta.

Biography 
Ramada was born on September 16, 1950, the Uruguayan diplomatic representative studied at the Colegio del Sagrado Corazón de los padres Jesuitas in Montevideo and also attended the Instituto de Estudios Humanísticos y Clásicos de la Compañía de Jesús.

He developed his career as a university teacher in the areas of history, law, political science, social philosophy and sociology, he is a founding member of the Center for Social Research in Montevideo, of which he was head of the Research Department and director.

He has been an advisor to the Uruguayan Episcopal Conference, professor at the Pontificia Universidad Católica de Paraná, in Brazil, and founder of the project "Patrística Latinoamericana-siglos XVI-XVIII" del Instituto de Teología Patrística Latinoamericana.

He developed activities in the diplomatic area, first as a counselor for the pharmaceutical industry in the Uruguayan embassy in Brazil, he was a member of the Commission for Foreign Trade of the Uruguayan Chamber of Industry and an advisor to the Mercosur Technical Group for health and food.

References

1950 births
Uruguayan theologians
Ambassadors of Uruguay to the Holy See
Living people